The 59th Golden Globe Awards, honoring the best in film and television for 2001, were held on January 20, 2002. The nominations were announced on December 20, 2001.

Winners and nominees

Film

The following films received multiple nominations:

The following films received multiple wins:

Television

The following programs received multiple nominations:

The following programs received multiple wins:

Ceremony

Presenters 

 Ben Affleck
 Jessica Alba
 Annette Bening
 Halle Berry
 Benjamin Bratt
 Michael Caine
 Cameron Diaz
 Robert Downey, Jr.
 Ralph Fiennes
 Jamie Foxx
 Andy Garcia
 Mel Gibson
 Kelsey Grammer
 Tom Hanks
 Josh Hartnett
 Kate Hudson
 Jeremy Irons
 Hugh Jackman
 Julia Louis-Dreyfus
 Andie MacDowell
 Dylan McDermott
 Ian McKellen
 Carrie-Anne Moss
 Mike Myers
 Sarah Jessica Parker
 Ryan Phillippe
 Dennis Quaid
 Leah Remini
 Martin Sheen
 Sting
 Audrey Tautou
 Sela Ward
 Naomi Watts
 Damon Wayans
 Tom Welling
 Kate Winslet
Renée Zellweger

Cecil B. DeMille Award 
Harrison Ford

Awards breakdown 
The following networks received multiple nominations:

The following networks received multiple wins:

See also
 74th Academy Awards
 22nd Golden Raspberry Awards
 8th Screen Actors Guild Awards
 53rd Primetime Emmy Awards
 54th Primetime Emmy Awards
 55th British Academy Film Awards
 56th Tony Awards
 2001 in film
 2001 in American television

References

059
2001 film awards
2001 television awards
January 2002 events in the United States
Golden